Thomas is a common surname of English, Welsh, Irish, Scottish, French, German, Dutch, and Danish origin.

It derives from the medieval personal name, of Biblical origin, from Aramaic תאומא t'om'a, a byname meaning 'twin'. It was borne by one of the disciples of Christ, best known for his skepticism about Christ's resurrection (John 20:24–29). The th- spelling in English results from the initial letter of the name in the Greek New Testament being a theta. The English pronunciation as t rather than a dental fricative is the result of French influence from an early date. In Britain, the surname is widely distributed throughout the country, but especially common in Cornwall and Wales. Thomas is the ninth most common surname in the United Kingdom. It is found as a personal name among Christians in India, and in the United States; it is also used as a family name among the Saint Thomas Christian families from Kerala, South India.

In the 1990 United States Census, Thomas was the twelfth most common surname, accounting for 0.3% of the population.

In France, Thomas (pronounced ) is the third most widespread surname after Martin and Bernard, with over 100,000 people with this name.

People

Surnames

A
Aaron Thomas (disambiguation), multiple people
Abraham Thomas (surgeon) (born 1950), Indian reconstructive surgeon
Adalius Thomas (born 1977), American footballer
Adam Thomas (disambiguation), multiple people
Ade Renner Thomas, former Chief Justice of Sierra Leone
Adonis Thomas (born 1993), American basketball player
Adrian Thomas (composer) (born 19??), British? music academic
Adrian P. Thomas (born c. 1982), American convicted and then acquitted of infanticide
Adrienne Thomas (novelist), pseudonym of Hertha Deutsch (1897–1980), a German novelist
Adrienne Thomas (archivist) (born 19??), acting Archivist of the United States
Ahmad Thomas (born 1994), American football player
Aidan Thomas (born 19??), English footballer
Aiden Thomas (born 19??), Latin-American writer
A. J. Thomas (disambiguation), multiple people
Akeem Thomas (born 1990), Antiguan international footballer
Aki Thomas (born 1979), American basketball coach
Alan Thomas (disambiguation), multiple people
Albert and Albie Thomas (disambiguation), multiple people
Albie Thomas (1935–2013), Australian middle- and long-distance runner
Alec Thomas (c. 1894 – 19??), Native American linguist, anthropologist and politician
Aled Thomas (born 1985), Welsh rugby union footballer
Alek Thomas (born 2000), American baseball player
Alex Thomas (born 1978), English rock drummer
Alfonso Thomas (born 1977), South African cricketer
Alfred Thomas (disambiguation), multiple people
Algernon Thomas (1857–1937), New Zealand academic
Allan Thomas (born 1990), Lebanese-South African football goalkeeper
Allen Thomas (1830–1907), Confederate States Army brigadier general
Alma Thomas (1891–1978), American expressionist painter
Alun Thomas (1926–1991), Welsh international rugby union footballer
Alyssa Thomas (born 1992), American basketball player
Amber Thomas (born 1993), Canadian Paralympic swimmer
Ambroise Thomas (1811–1896), French opera composer
Ambry Thomas (born 1999), American football player
Aminta Thomas (born 1990), Australian handball player
Amos Thomas (1826–1???), American politician
Anatole Thomas (born 1970), English cricketer
André J. Thomas (born 1952), American composer
Andre Thomas, American man on death row for murdering his estranged wife and two children
Andrea Thomas (German athlete) (born 1963), German Olympic sprinter
Andrea Thomas (Jamaican athlete) (born 1968), Jamaican Olympic sprinter and middle-distance runner
Andrés Thomas (born 1963), Dominican baseball player
Andrew and Andy Thomas (disambiguation), multiple people
Angie Thomas (born 1988), American young adult author 
Annette Thomas (born 1965), American-born publishing executive
Anthony Thomas (disambiguation), multiple people
Antoine Thomas (disambiguation), multiple people
Antonia Thomas (born 1986), English actress
 Antonio Thomas, ring name of Tom Matera (born 1980), American wrestler
Antony Thomas (born 1940), English filmmaker
Anup Mathew Thomas (born 1977), Indian visual artist
Arthur Thomas (disambiguation), multiple people
Arwel Thomas (born 1974), Welsh rugby union international
 Ashley Thomas (born 1985), English musician and actor aka Bashy
Aswad Thomas (born 1989), English footballer
Athir Thomas (born 1987), South Sudanese international footballer
Audra Thomas, Northern Irish TV presenter
Audrey Thomas (born 1935), Canadian novelist and short story writer
Augusta Read Thomas (born 1964), American composer
Aurealius Thomas (1934–2021), American footballer
Austin Thomas (1939–2018), Aruban Olympic fencer

B
Barrie Thomas (born 1937), English footballer
Barry Thomas (rugby union) (1937–2018), New Zealand rugby union player
Barry Thomas (born 1951), British motorcycle speedway driver
Barry Thomas (sound engineer) (Born 19??), American sound engineer
Béatrice Thomas (born 1984), American born German funk & soul singer
Ben and Benjamin Thomas (disambiguation), multiple people
Bernard Thomas (born 1945), Welsh Anglican Archdeacon
Bert Thomas (1883–1966), British cartoonist
Bess Thomas (1892–1968), Australian librarian
Betsy Thomas, American television writer
Betty Thomas (born 1948), American actress and director
Bill and Billie Thomas (disambiguation), multiple people
B. J. Thomas (1942–2021), American pop singer
Blair Thomas (born 1967), American football player and coach
Bob, Bobbie and Bobby Thomas (disambiguation), multiple people
Bode Thomas (1918–1953), Nigerian politician
Borger Thomas (born 1995), Norwegian footballer
Brad and Bradley Thomas (disambiguation), multiple people
Brandon Thomas (disambiguation), multiple people
Brayden Thomas (born 1998), American football player
Brian Thomas (rugby union) (1940–2012), Wales international rugby union footballer
Brian Thomas (church artist) (dates unknown), 20th Century British artist
Broderick Thomas (born 1967), American footballer
Bronwen Thomas (born 1969), Canadian freestyle skier
Bruce Thomas (born 1948), English rock bassist
Bruce Thomas (actor) (born 1961), American actor
Bryan Thomas (disambiguation), multiple people
Bud Thomas (pitcher) (1910–2001), American baseball pitcher
Bud Thomas (shortstop) (1929–2015), American baseball shortstop
Burke Thomas, American musician and record producer
Buzz Thomas (born 1969), American politician in Michigan
B. W. R. Thomas (born 1940s), Sri Lankan cricketer

C
Caitlin Thomas (1913–1994), author wife of Dylan Thomas
Calvin Thomas (disambiguation), multiple people
Cam and Cameron Thomas (disambiguation), multiple people
Carl Thomas (disambiguation), multiple people
Carla Thomas (born 1942), American singer
Carla Thomas (basketball), American basketball player
Carlos Thomas (born 1987), American Canadian football defensive back
Carmen Thomas (born 1946), German journalist, radio and television presenter, author and lecturer
Caroline Thomas (1959–2008), British international relations academic
Caryl Thomas (born 1986), Welsh rugby union player
Casey Thomas (born 1990), Welsh footballer
Catherine Thomas (born 1963), Welsh politician
Catherine Thomas (born 1990), British fashion model
Catrin Thomas (born 1964), British ski mountaineer and mountain climber
Cecil Thomas (disambiguation), multiple people
Ceiron Thomas (born 1983), Welsh rugby union footballer
Celia Thomas, Baroness Thomas of Winchester (born 1945), British politician
Ceri Thomas British journalist and media executive
C. F. Thomas Chennikkara Francis Thomas (1939–2020), Indian politician
Chad Thomas (born 1995), American football player
Chance Thomas (born 1960s), American composer
Chantal Thomas (born 1945), French writer and historian
Chantal J.M. Thomas, American law professor
Charlene Thomas (born 1982), English middle-distance runner
Charles Thomas (disambiguation), multiple people
Chase Thomas (born 1989), American footballer
Chelsea Thomas (born 1990), American softball player
Chloe Thomas (born 19??), British TV and film director
Chris Thomas (disambiguation), multiple people
Christi Thomas (born 1982), American basketball player
Christian Thomas (disambiguation), multiple people
Christopher Thomas (1818–1879), American politician and lawyer
Chuck Thomas (American football) (born 1960), professional American football player
Claire Thomas (born 1986), American food enthusiast and blogger
Clare Thomas (born 1989), British actress
Clarence Thomas (born 1948), United States Supreme Court justice
Claude Thomas (disambiguation), multiple people
Clem Thomas (1929–1996), Welsh rugby union international
Clendon Thomas (born 1935), American footballer
Clete Thomas (born 1983), American baseball player
Clevan Thomas (born 1979), American footballer
Clint Thomas (1896–1990), American baseball player
Clive Thomas (disambiguation)
Cody Thomas (born 1994), American baseball player
Colette Thomas (1929–2001), French Olympic swimmer
Conor Thomas (born 1993), English footballer
Corey Thomas (American football) (born 1975), American football player
Cori Thomas, American playwright
Courtney Thomas (born 1988), American beauty pageant titleholder
Craig Thomas (disambiguation), multiple people
Curtis Thomas (born 1948), American politician in Pennsylvania
Cyriac Thomas (born 1943), Indian academic
Cyril Thomas (born 1976), French boxer

D
Dafydd Elis-Thomas (born 1946), Welsh politician
Dai Thomas (rugby league) (1879–1958), rugby league footballer who played in the 1900s for Other Nationalities, and Oldham
Dai Thomas (1909-??), Welsh international rugby union footballer
Dai Thomas (footballer, born 1975), Welsh footballer
Dale O. Thomas (1923–2004), American wrestler and wrestling coach
Dale Thomas (born 1987), Australian rules footballer
Dallas Thomas (born 1989), American footballer
Damien Thomas (born 1942), British actor
Damon Thomas (disambiguation), multiple people
Dan Thomas (disambiguation), multiple people
Dana Thomas (born 1964), American fashion journalist
Daniel, Daniela, Dann and Danny Thomas (disambiguation), multiple people
Dante Thomas (born 1978) American R&B singer and musician
Darren Thomas (born 1975), Welsh footballer
Darron Thomas (born 1990), American football
Da'shawn Thomas (born 1987), US Canadian footballer
Dave and David Thomas (disambiguation) multiple people
Davyd Thomas (born 1956), Deputy Chief of Navy, Royal Australian Navy
Dean Thomas (disambiguation), multiple people
DeAndre Thomas (born 1986), American basketball player
De'Anthony Thomas (born 1993), American footballer
Debi Thomas (born 1967), American Olympic figure skater
Dee Thomas (born 1967), American footballer
Delano Thomas, American indoor volleyball player
Delme Thomas (born 1942), Welsh rugby union international
Demaryius Thomas (1987–2021), American football player
Denise Thomas (born 1979), Irish footballer
Dennis "Dee Tee" Thomas (1951–2021), founding member of the band Kool & the Gang
Deon Thomas (born 1971), American-Israeli basketball player
Derek Thomas (disambiguation), multiple people
Derrel Thomas (born 1951), American baseball player
Derrick Thomas (agricultural scientist) (1944–2013), British agricultural scientist
Derrick Thomas (1967–2000), US American football player
Deshaun Thomas (born 1991), American basketball player
Devin Thomas (born 1986), American footballer
Devon Thomas (born 1989), West Indian cricketer from Antigua
Diane Thomas (1946–1985), American screenwriter
Dick Thomas (disambiguation), multiple people
Dillon Thomas (born 1992), American baseball player
Din Thomas (born 1976), American mixed martial artist
D. M. Thomas (born 1935), British novelist, poet, playwright and translator
Dom Thomas (born 1996), Scottish footballer
Dominic Thomas (born 1995), English footballer
Donald and Donnie Thomas (disambiguation), multiple people
Dontarrious Thomas (born 1980), American footballer
Dorival Thomas (born 1976), Brazilian footballer
Dorothy Thomas (disambiguation), multiple people
Doug Thomas (born 1983), American basketball player
Douglas Thomas (born 1966), American scholar, researcher and journalist
Douglas Thomas (politician) (born 1969), American politician in Maine
DQ Thomas (born 1998), American football player
Duane Thomas (born 1947), American football running back
Duane Thomas (boxer) (1961–2000), American boxer
Dwayne Thomas (born 1984), American Virgin Islands footballer
Dwight Thomas (born 1980), Jamaican sprinter
Dylan Thomas (1914–1953), Welsh poet
Dywane Thomas, Jr. (born 1990), American bassist and experimental musician

E
Earl and Earle Thomas (disambiguation), multiple people
Earlie Thomas (1945–2022), American footballer
E. Donnall Thomas (1920–2012), American physician, developer of bone marrow transplant
Ed and Eddie Thomas (disambiguation), multiple people
Edgar Thomas (cricketer) (1875–1936), English cricketer
Edgar Thomas (footballer) (1895–?), Welsh international footballer
Edmund Thomas (Parliamentarian) (1633–1677), Welsh politician
Edmund Thomas, New Zealand jurist
Edward Thomas (disambiguation), multiple people
Edwin Thomas (disambiguation), multiple people
E. J. Thomas American politician in Ohio
Elin Manahan Thomas (born 1977), Welsh soprano
Elizabeth Thomas (disambiguation), multiple people
Ella Thomas (born 1991), Eritrean-American model and actress
Ellen Thomas (born 1947), American peace activist
Ellen Thomas (born 1956), British actress
Elliot Griffin Thomas (1926–2019), American Roman Catholic bishop
Elmer Thomas (1876–1965), U.S. Senator from Oklahoma
Elvis Thomas (soccer, born 1972), Canadian international soccer player
Elvis Thomas (footballer, born 1994), Antiguan footballer
Emily Thomas Australian Olympic snowboarder
Emma Thomas British film producer
Emmitt Thomas (born 1943), American football player and coach
Emory Thomas (born 1939), American historian and academic
Ena Thomas (1935–2020), Welsh television chef
Ender Thomas, Venezuelan singer-songwriter
E. Parry Thomas (1921–2016), American banker
Eric Thomas (disambiguation), multiple people
Erich Thomas (1897–1960), German flying ace
Ernest Ivy Thomas, Jr. (1924–1945), U.S. Marine
Ernest Lee Thomas (born 1949), American actor
Ernst-Marcus Thomas (born 1973), German TV host, radio dj and journalist
Eustase Thomas-Salignac (1847–1943), French tenor
Evan Thomas (disambiguation), multiple people
Evelyn Thomas (born 1953), American pop singer
Évelyne Thomas (born 1964), French TV talk show host

F
Faith Thomas (born 1933), Australian cricket and field hockey player
Fay Thomas (1903–1990), baseball player
 Forrest M. Thomas Jr. (1953–2013), American singer known as Forrest
Francis Thomas (disambiguation), multiple people
Frank and Frankie Thomas (disambiguation), multiple people
Franklin Thomas (disambiguation), multiple people
Frazier Thomas (1918–1985), American TV presenter and children's author
Fred, Freddie, Frederic and Frederick Thomas (disambiguation), multiple people
Freeman Thomas (born 1957), American automobile designer
Frosty Thomas (1881–1970), American baseball player
F.W.L. Thomas (c.1812–1885), Royal Navy officer, photographer, and historian

G
 G. Thomas, pseudonym of American music video director Paul Hunter (director)
Gabriel Thomas (1824–1905), French sculptor
Gabriel Thomas (aviator) (born 1896, date of death unknown), French World War I flying ace
Gareth Thomas (disambiguation), multiple people
Garth Thomas (born 1963), American footballer
Garvin Thomas, American TV journalist
Gary Thomas (disambiguation), multiple people
Gavin Thomas (born 1977), Welsh rugby union international
 Gene Thomas (1937–2012), American pop singer, one half of the duo Gene & Debbe
Geoff and Geoffrey Thomas (disambiguation), multiple people
Georg Thomas (1890–1946) German general
George Thomas (disambiguation), multiple people
Geraint Thomas (born 1986), Welsh racing cyclist
Gerald Thomas (disambiguation), multiple people
Gerard Thomas (1663–1721), Flemish Baroque painter
Gerrit Thomas (born 1973), German electronic musician
Gerry Thomas (1922–2005), American salesman
Glen Thomas (born 1967), English football player
Glynne Thomas (1935–2021), British ice hockey player
Gordon Thomas (disambiguation), multiple people
Gorman Thomas (born 1950), American baseball player
Grady Thomas (born 1941), American singer
Graeme Thomas (born 1988), British rower
Graham Stuart Thomas (1909–2003), English horticulturalist and garden designer
Grahame Thomas (born 1938), Australian cricketer
Grant Thomas (disambiguation), multiple people
Greg Thomas (born 1960), Welsh cricketer who played for England
Guy Thomas (born 1977), New Zealand equestrian
Gwenda Thomas (born 1942), Welsh labour party politician
Gwyn Thomas (disambiguation), multiple people

H
Hank Willis Thomas (born 1976), American visual artist
Harold Thomas (disambiguation), multiple people
Harry Thomas (disambiguation), multiple people
Harvey Thomas, American luthier
Haydn Thomas (born 1982), English rugby union footballer
Heather Thomas (born 1957), American actress, screenwriter, author and political activist
Heck Thomas (1850–1912) Oklahoma lawman
Héctor Thomas (1938–2008), Venezuelan Olympic decathlete
Hedley Thomas, Australian investigative journalist and author
Heidi Thomas (born 1962), English screenwriter and playwright
Helen Thomas (1920–2013), American journalist and author
Hendry Thomas (born 1985), Honduran footballer
Henri and Henry Thomas (disambiguation), multiple people
Hilah Thomas (1909–2009), American medical science writer
Hiram Thomas (1889–1974), Canadian politician in Nova Scotia
Hollis Thomas (born 1974), American football player and coach
Holly A. Thomas, American judge
Homer L. Thomas (1913–2003), American art historian and archaeologist
Horace Thomas (1890–1916), Welsh rugby union international
Howard Thomas (1909–1986), UK radio producer and TV executive
Howard Thomas (scientist) (1948–2022), Welsh plant scientist
Howard Thomas (wrestler) (1905–1995), Canadian wrestler
Hugh Thomas (disambiguation), multiple people
Huw Thomas (1927–2009), Welsh broadcaster, barrister and Liberal politician

I
Ian Thomas (disambiguation), multiple people
Ibrahima Thomas (born 1987), Senegalese basketball player
Iestyn Thomas (born 1976), Welsh rugby union international
Ike Thomas (born 1947), American football cornerback
Imogen Thomas (born 1982), Welsh model and TV personality
Ira Thomas (1881–1958), American baseball player
Irma Thomas (born 1941), American singer
Irving Thomas (born 1966), American basketball player
Irwin Thomas (born 1971), Australian singer-songwriter and guitarist
Isaac Thomas (1784–1859), American congressman from Tennessee
Isaiah and Isiah Thomas (disambiguation), multiple people
Iwan Thomas (born 1974), British (Welsh) Olympic athlete

J
Jack Thomas (disambiguation), multiple people
Jackie Thomas (singer) (born 1990), winner of the first series of The X Factor in New Zealand
Jacob Thomas (VC) (1833–1911), British Victoria Cross recipient
Jacob Thomas (soccer) (born 1977), American soccer player
Jacqueline Thomas, victim in a high-profile English murder case from the 1960s
Jade Thomas (born 1982), Welsh footballer
Jah Thomas (born 1955), Jamaican dj and record producer
Jaimie Thomas (born 1986), American football player
Jake Thomas (born 1990), American actor
Jake Thomas (Canadian football) (born 1990), Canadian football defensive tackle
Jamario Thomas (born 1985), American football player
Jamel Thomas (born 1976), American basketball player
James Thomas (disambiguation), multiple people
Jamie Thomas (disambiguation), multiple people
Jamo Thomas, American funk and soul singer
Jan Thomas (born 1958), American children's book author and illustrator
Jane Thomas (disambiguation), multiple people
J. Antonio Thomas (1912–1998), Canadian politician
Jarret Thomas (born 1981), American Olympic snowboarder
Jasmine Thomas (basketball) (born 1989), American basketball player
Jason Thomas (Marine), US marine and September 11 rescuer
Jason Thomas (footballer) (born 1997), Vanuatuan footballer
Jay Thomas (1948–2017), American actor, comedian and radio talk-show host
Jay Thomas (American football) (born 1960), American football coach
Jean Bell Thomas (1881–1982), American folk festival promoter
Jean Thomas (biochemist) (born 1942), Welsh; Master of St Catharine's College, Cambridge
Jean Thomas (novelist), pseudonym of American romantic novelist Robert "Bob" Rogers
Jean-Charles Thomas (born 1929), French Roman Catholic bishop
Jean-Christophe Thomas (born 1964), French footballer
Jean-Claude Thomas (1950–2018), French politician
Jeff and Jeffrey Thomas (disambiguation)
Jemea Thomas (born 1990), American footballer
Jennifer Thomas (born 1973), American fitness model and wrestler
Jeremy Thomas (born 1949), British film producer
Jermaine Thomas (born 1990), American football running back
Jermaine Thomas (basketball) (born 1984), American basketball player
Jérôme Thomas (born 1979), French boxer
Jerome Thomas (born 1983), English footballer
Jerry Thomas (disambiguation), multiple people
Jess Thomas (1927–1993), American operatic tenor
Jesse Thomas (disambiguation), multiple people
Jessica Thomas (born 1984), Australian netball player
Jessie Thomas, American educator
Jewerl Thomas (born 1957), American footballer
Jim and Jimmy Thomas (disambiguation), multiple people
Jithin Thomas (born 1990), Indian high jumper
Joan Thomas, Canadian novelist and book reviewer
Jobey Thomas (born 1980), American basketball player
Jodi Thomas, pen name of American author Jodi Koumalats
Joe Thomas (disambiguation), multiple people
Joel Thomas (disambiguation), multiple people
Joey Thomas (born 1980), American football player for the Miami Dolphins
Johannes Thomas (born 1949), (East) German Olympic rower
John and Johnny Thomas (disambiguation), multiple people
Jomo Thomas (born 1974), American businessman, attorney and author
Jon R. Thomas (1946–2017), US Assistant Secretary of State
Jonathan Thomas (born 1982), Welsh rugby union international
Jonathan Taylor Thomas (born 1981), American TV and movie actor
Jordan Thomas (American football) (born 1996), American football player
Jose Thomas, Indian film director
Joseph Thomas (disambiguation), multiple people
Josh Thomas (disambiguation), multiple people
Josiah Thomas (disambiguation), multiple people
Joy Thomas, Indian politician
Joy A. Thomas (1963–2020) American Indian-born information theorist, science, and author
Joyce Carol Thomas (1938–2016), American poet and playwright
Joyyan Thomas (born 1998), Pakistani footballer
J. Parnell Thomas (1895–1970), U.S. Congressman from New Jersey
J. T. Thomas (disambiguation), multiple people
Jules Thomas (1886–1943), American baseball player
Julia Thomas (died 1879), British woman murdered by her maid
Julie Thomas (born 1967), Welsh lawn bowler
Julie Thomas, first Chief Minister of Saint Helena
Julian Thomas (journalist) (1843–1896), English-born Australian journalist and author
Julian Thomas (born 1959), British archaeologist
Julius Thomas (born 1988), American football player
Justin Thomas (disambiguation), multiple people

K

Kadell Thomas (born 1996), Canadian soccer player
Karen P. Thomas (born 1957), American composer
Karin Thomas (born 1961), Swiss Olympic cross country skier
Karine Thomas (born 1989), Canadian Olympic synchronised swimmer
Karl Thomas (disambiguation), multiple people
Karolin Thomas (born 1985), German footballer
 Katherine Thomas (born 1966), English-born American musician known as The Great Kat
Kathrin Thomas (1944–2023), Lord Lieutenant of Mid Glamorgan
Kathryn Thomas (born 1979), Irish TV presenter
Keith Thomas (disambiguation), multiple people
Kelly Thomas (born 1981), British Olympic bobsledder
Ken, Keni, Kenn, Kenneth and Kenny Thomas (disambiguation), multiple people
Keir Thomas (born 1998), American football player
Keshia Thomas, an African-American photographed shielding a white man at a KKK rally
Kevin Thomas (disambiguation), multiple people
Keyeno Thomas (born 1977), Trinidadian international footballer
Khyri Thomas (born 1996), American basketball player for Maccabi Tel Aviv of the Israeli Basketball Premier League and the EuroLeague
Kiondre Thomas (born 1998), American football player
Kit Thomas (born 1947), American film maker and record producer
Kiwaukee Thomas (born 1977), US American and Canadian footballer
Kris Thomas (born 1984), American singer
Kristen Thomas (born 1993), American rugby player
Kristian Thomas (born 1989), British Olympic gymnast
Kristin Scott Thomas (born 1960), English actress
Krystal Thomas (born 1989), American basketball player
Kurt Thomas (disambiguation), multiple people
K.V. Thomas (born 1946), Indian politician
Kwame Thomas (born 1995), English footballer
Kyle Thomas (born 1983), Canadian writer, director, producer, and actor

L
Lamaar Thomas (born 1990), American footballer
Lamar Thomas (born 1970), American footballer
Lance Thomas (born 1988), American basketball player
Lane Thomas (born 1995), American baseball player
Larri Thomas (1932–2013), American actress and dancer
Larry Thomas (disambiguation), multiple people
Latasha Thomas (born 1965), American politician in Chicago
LaToya Thomas (born 1981), American basketball player
Laura Thomas, Welsh lawn and indoor bowler
Laurence Thomas, American philosopher and academic
Lavale Thomas (born 1963), American footballer
Lawrence S. Thomas, III, retired American brigadier general
Lawrence Thomas (footballer) (born 1992), Australian footballer
Lee Thomas (disambiguation), multiple people
Leland Evan Thomas (1918–1942), United States Marine Corps pilot
Len Thomas (1908–1943), Australian rules footballer
Leo Thomas (1923–2001), American baseball player
Leon Thomas (1937–1999), American jazz singer
Leon Thomas III (born 1993), American actor, songwriter and singer
Leron Thomas (born 1979), American jazz trumpeter, composer and vocalist
LeSean Thomas (born 1975), American TV animation producer, director, animator, comic book artist and writer
Les and Leslie Thomas (disambiguation), multiple people
Lewis Thomas (disambiguation), multiple people
Lillian Thomas (born 1949), Canadian politician in Winnipeg
Lillo Thomas (born 1961), American athlete and soul musician
Lily Thomas (1927–2019), Indian lawyer
Lindsay Thomas (disambiguation), multiple people
L. Joseph Thomas (born 1942), American educator and administrator
Llewellyn Thomas (1865–1924), English cricketer
Llewellyn Thomas (1903–1992), British physicist and applied mathematician
Logan Thomas (born 1991), American footballer
Lorenzo Thomas (1804–1875), American Army officer and temporary Secretary of War under Andrew Johnson
Lorenzo Thomas (poet) (1944–2005), Panamanian-born American poet
Lorna Thomas (1917–2014), Australian cricket player and manager
Lot Thomas (1843–1905), American judge and congressman
Louie Myfanwy Thomas (1908–68), Welsh writer
Louis Thomas, Count of Soissons (1657–1702), Savoyard Prince and Imperial Austrian Army officer
Louis Thomas (writer) (1885–1962), French writer
Lowell Thomas (1892–1981), American writer, broadcaster, traveler, and businessman
Lowell Thomas, Jr. (1923–2016), American film and television producer, Alaskan state senator
Luke Thomas (born 1993), Welsh chef
Lyda Ann Thomas, Mayor of Galveston, Texas
Lynda Thomas (born 1981), Mexican musician and singer-songwriter
Lynn Thomas (1959–2021), American football player
Lynne Thomas (born 1939), Welsh cricketer (played for England)
Lynne M. Thomas, American librarian

M
M. Louise Thomas (1822-1907), American social reformer 
Mable Thomas, American politician in Georgia
Madison Thomas, Canadian film and television director
Malcolm Thomas (disambiguation), multiple people
Mandisa Thomas American atheist activist
Mansel Thomas (1909–1986), Welsh composer and conductor
Marc Thomas (computer scientist) (1950–2017), American computer scientist and mathematician
Marc Thomas (rugby player) (born 1990), Welsh rugby union footballer
Marco Thomas (born 1983), American footballer
Marcus Thomas (disambiguation), multiple people
Margaret Thomas (disambiguation), multiple people
Marie Thomas (1896–1966), Indonesian physician 
Marjorie Thomas (1923–2008), English opera and oratorio singer
Mark Thomas (disambiguation), multiple people
Marlo Thomas (born 1937), American actress, daughter of Danny Thomas
Martha Gibbons Thomas (1869–1942), American politician
Martin Thomas (disambiguation), multiple people
Martyn Thomas (born 1948), British software engineer
Martyn Thomas (rugby player) (born 1987), Welsh rugby union player
Marvell Thomas, American keyboard player
Mary Thomas (1787–1875), Australian poet and settler
Mary-Anne Thomas (born 1963), Australian politician in Victoria
Mathew, Matt and Matthew Thomas (disambiguation), multiple people
Max Thomas (disambiguation), multiple people
May Miles Thomas (born 1959), Scottish film director
M. Carey Thomas (1857–1935), American suffragette and educator
Meamea Thomas (1987–2013), I-Kiribati Olympic weightlifter
Mel Thomas (born 1985), American basketball player
Melissa Thomas, Australian actress
Michael Thomas (disambiguation), multiple people
Michel Thomas (1914–2005), Polish-born French resistance fighter, linguist and American educator
Michelle Thomas (c. 1968 – 1998), American actress
Mick, Mickey, and Mike Thomas (disambiguation), multiple people
Mickalene Thomas (born 1971), American artist
Mikel Thomas (born 1987), Trinidad and Tobago sprinter
Miles Thomas (1897–1980), British business executive
Milt Thomas, American author and novelist
Mitchell Thomas (born 1964), English footballer
Mitchell Thomas Soldier Australian Army RAAC (Born 1997), Soldier
Mitchell Thomas (curler) (born 1998), Australian curler
Momo Thomas (born 1990), American footballer
Morgan Thomas (1824–1903), Welsh-Australian surgeon and public benefactor

N
Naím Thomas (born 1980), Spanish singer and actor
Natasha Thomas (born 1986), Danish pop singer-songwriter
Nathan Thomas (disambiguation), multiple people
Ned Thomas (rugby league), Welsh rugby league footballer who played in the 1910s, and 1920s
Neil Thomas (Canadian football) (born c. 1940), Canadian football player
Neil Thomas (gymnast) (born 1968), English Olympic gymnast
Nelly Thomas, Australian comedian
Nene Thomas (born 1968), American fantasy artist
Nicholas, Nick, Nicky and Nico Thomas (disambiguation), multiple people
Nikki Thomas, Deputy Director of 'Sex Professionals of Canada'
Nils Thomas (1889–1979), Norwegian Olympic sailor
Niveda Thomas (born 1995), Indian actress
Noel Thomas Sir John Noel Thomas (1915–1983), British general in WWII
Noel Thomas (curler) (born 1980), English wheelchair curler
Noemie Thomas (born 1996), Canadian swimmer
Nolan Thomas, American singer
Norman Thomas (disambiguation), multiple people
Norman Thomas (1884–1968), American socialist and six-time presidential candidate
Norris Thomas (born 1954), American footballer
Nutter Thomas (Arthur Nutter Thomas) (1869–1954), Anglican Bishop of Adelaide

O
Oldfield Thomas (1858–1929), British zoologist
Olive Thomas (1894–1920), American actress
 Olivia Jordan Thomas, birth name of Olivia Jordan (born 1988), American actress, model and beauty queen
Oliver Thomas (born 1957), American politician in New Orleans
Olivier Thomas (born 1974), French footballer
Omar Thomas (born 1982), American basketball player
Oswald Thomas (1882–1963), German astronomer
Owen Thomas (disambiguation), multiple people

P
P. A. Thomas, Indian film director, producer, scriptwriter and actor
Paca Thomas, American animator
Pam Thomas, American TV producer, director and casting director
Pascal Thomas (born 1945), French screenwriter and film director
Pat and Patrick Thomas (disambiguation), multiple people
Patty Thomas (dancer) (1922-2014)
Paul Thomas (disambiguation), multiple people
P.C. Thomas (born 1950), Indian politician
P. D. G. Thomas (1930–2020), Welsh historian
Peelipose Thomas, Indian politician
Perry Thomas American football coach
Pete and Peter Thomas (disambiguation), multiple people
Petria Thomas (born 1975), Australian Olympic swimmer
Phil, Philip, Philipa, Philippa and Phillip Thomas (disambiguation), multiple people
Phoebe Thomas (born 1983), British actress
Pierre Thomas (disambiguation), multiple people
Pinklon Thomas (born 1958), American boxer
Prince Varughese Thomas (born 1969), Indian-American artist
Prins Thomas, Norwegian record producer and dj
Priya Thomas, Canadian musician, dancer and choreographer
P. T. Thomas (1950–2021) Indian politician

Q
Quantavious Thomas (born 1992), American rapper professionally known as Young Nudy
Quentin Thomas (born 1944), British civil servant

R
Rachel Thomas (actress) (1905–1995), Welsh actress
Rachel Thomas (skydiver), Indian skydiver
Rachel Thomas (academic), American computer scientist
Rackley Thomas (born 1980), Antigua and Barbudan international footballer
Radha Thomas, Indian jazz musician
Rajaji Mathew Thomas (born 1954), Indian politician
Ralph Thomas (disambiguation), several people
Ramblin' Thomas (c.1902–c.1945), American country blues singer, guitarist and songwriter
Randal E. Thomas, American Army officer
Randy Thomas (musician) (born 1954), American Christian musician
Randy Thomas (American football) (born 1976), American football player
Rasta Thomas (born 1981), American dancer, martial artist, gymnast and choreographer
Ratcliff Thomas (born 1974), American footballer
Ráv Thomas, Australian singer-songwriter
Ray Thomas (disambiguation), several people
Raymond Thomas (disambiguation), several people
Rebecca Thomas, American filmmaker
Red Thomas (1898–1962), American baseball player
Reg and Reggie Thomas (disambiguation). multiple people
Regena Thomas, American politician
Regina D. Thomas, American politician in Georgia
Regis Deon Thomas (born 1970), American convicted murderer on death row in California
Reji Thomas, American artist
Rekha R. Thomas, American mathematician
René Thomas (disambiguation), multiple people
Reno Thomas (1922–2009), American politician in Pennsylvania
Rhodri Glyn Thomas (born 1953), Welsh politician
Rhys Thomas (disambiguation), multiple people
Richard, Richie, Ricki, Ricky and Ritchie Thomas (disambiguation), several people
Rob Thomas (disambiguation), several people
Robin Thomas (born 1949), American actor and sculptor
Robin Thomas (mathematician) (1962–2020), American mathematician
Roc Thomas (born 1995), American football player
Rod Thomas (born 1947), Welsh international footballer
Rod Thomas (priest) (born 1954), English priest
Rodney Thomas (1973–2014), American footballer
Rodolphe Thomas (born 1962), French politician
Roger Thomas (disambiguation), multiple people
Rohn Thomas, American actor
Romain Thomas (born 1988), French footballer
Ron, Ronald, Ronni and Ronnie Thomas (disambiguation), multiple people
Rose Thomas (disambiguation), multiple people 
Rosemary Thomas (1901–1961), American poet and teacher
Rosie Thomas (writer) (born 1947), British writer
Rosie Thomas (singer-songwriter) (born c. 1978), American singer-songwriter
Ross Thomas (author) (1926–1995), American writer of crime fiction
Ross Thomas (actor) (born 1981), American actor
Roy Thomas (disambiguation), multiple people
Rozonda Thomas (born 1971), American R&B singer
R. S. Thomas (1913–2000), Welsh poet and Anglican clergyman
Rufus Thomas (1917–2001), American R&B singer
Russ Thomas (1924–1991), American football player
Russell Thomas, American operatic tenor
Ruth Thomas (children's writer) (1927–2011), English author
Ruth Thomas (novelist) (born 1967), British writer
Ryan Thomas (disambiguation), multiple people

S
Sally Thomas (born 1939), Australian judge
Sam Fan Thomas, Cameroonian musician
Samuel Thomas (priest) (1627–1693), English nonjuring clergyman and controversialist
Samuel Bell Thomas (died 1943), New York lawyer
Sandra Thomas (born 1986), Indian film producer and actress
Santonio Thomas (born 1981), American footballer
Sara Thomas (born 1941), American politician in Mississippi
Sarah Thomas (disambiguation), multiple people
Scarlett Thomas (born 1972), English author
Scott Thomas (disambiguation), multiple people
Seán Thomas (died 1999), Irish football manager
Sean Patrick Thomas (born 1970), American actor
Semajay Thomas (born 1993), American boxer
Shamarko Thomas (born 1991), American footballer
Shardé Thomas (born 1990), American fife player
Shavar Thomas (born 1981), Jamaican footballer
Sheleen Thomas, American singer
Shenton Thomas (1879–1962), British Governor of Nyasaland, Gold Coast and the Straits Settlements
Sheray Thomas (born 1984), Canadian basketball player
Sheree Thomas, American writer
Sherry Thomas (born 1975), American novelist
Shirley Thomas (USC professor) (1920–2005), radio/television actress/writer/producer
Shirley Thomas (athlete) (born 1963), British Olympic sprinter
Sian Thomas (born 1953), Welsh actress
Sidney Runyan Thomas (born 1953), American judge
Simeon Thomas (born 1993), American football player
Simon Thomas (disambiguation), multiple people
Sinclair Thomas (born 1968), British Paralympic basketball player and coach
Skylar Thomas (born 1993), Canadian soccer player
Sloan Thomas (born 1981), American footballer
Solomon Thomas (born 1995), American football player
Sonya Thomas (born 1967), American competitive eater
Spencer Thomas (born 1951), American footballer
Stacey Thomas (born 1978), American basketball player
Stacey Thomas (American football) (born 1984), American football strong safety
Stan Thomas (disambiguation), multiple people
Stephen, Steve and Steven Thomas (disambiguation), multiple people
Stu Thomas (born 1967), Australian musician
Stuart Michael Thomas (born 1970), American composer
Sue Thomas (agent) (1950–2022), deaf FBI agent
Sue Thomas (author) (born 1951), English author
Sunset Thomas (born 1972), American artist and former pornographic actress
Susan Thomas, Baroness Thomas of Walliswood (born 1935), British businesswoman and politician
Sy Thomas (born 1979), British TV presenter, comedian and actor

T
Tabby Thomas (1929–2014), American blues musician
Taffy Thomas, English storyteller
Tamorley Thomas (born 1983), Antiguan international footballer
Tammy Thomas (born 1970/71), disgraced American sprint cyclist
Tanisha Thomas (born 1985), American reality TV participant
Tarlos Thomas (born 1977), American footballer
Taryn Thomas (born 1983), American pornographic actress
Tasha Thomas (–1984), American R&B and disco singer
TaShawn Thomas (born 1993), American basketball player in the Israeli Premier League
Tavierre Thomas (born 1996), American football player
Tavion Thomas (born 2000), American football player
Ted and Teddy Thomas (disambiguation), multiple people
Tennessee Thomas (born 1984), British drummer and actress
Terence Thomas, Baron Thomas of Macclesfield (1937–2018), British politician
Terrance Thomas (born 1980), American basketball player
Terrell Thomas (born 1985), American footballer
Terry Thomas (disambiguation), multiple people
Tessy Thomas (born 1964), Indian scientist
Theodore Thomas (disambiguation), multiple people
Thom Thomas (1935–2015), American Playwright
Thomas Thomas (disambiguation), multiple people
T. H. Thomas (1839–1915), Welsh artist
Thurman Thomas (born 1966), American football player
Tiara Thomas (born 1989), American singer-songwriter
Tillman Thomas (born 1947), Prime Minister of Grenada 2008–2013
Tilly Tjala Thomas, Australian singer/songwriter, winner of 2021 Emily Burrows Award
Timothy Thomas (disambiguation), multiple people
Tina Louise Thomas (born 1955), American beauty pageant title holder and singer
Tom and Tommy Thomas (disambiguation), multiple people
Tony Thomas (disambiguation), multiple people
Torey Thomas (born 1985), American basketball player
Tovino Thomas (born 1989), Indian actor
Tra Thomas (born 1974), American footballer
Tracie Thomas (born 1965), American musician and actress
Tracy Yerkes Thomas (1899–1983), American mathematician
Travis Thomas (born 1984), American footballer
Trevor Thomas (disambiguation), multiple people
T. Rhys Thomas (born 1982), Wales rugby union international hooker
Tristan Thomas (born 1986), Australian hurdler
Truth Thomas, American singer-songwriter and poet
Tyler Thomas (born 1990), American football player
Tyrus Thomas (born 1986), American basketball player

V
Valerie Thomas (scientist), American scientist and inventor
Vance Thomas, Puerto Rican attorney
Vaneese Thomas (born August 24, 1952), American R&B, jazz and soul blues singer
Vaughan Thomas (born 1945), English rugby league footballer who played in the 1960s
Vera Thomas English table tennis player
Verneda Thomas (1936–2016), American Olympic volleyball player
Vernon Thomas (born 1935), Anglo Indian author
Vernon Thomas (wrestler) (1914–1957), New Zealand wrestler
Viola Thomas (born 1939), Canadian barrel rolling champion
Virginia Thomas (born 1957), American attorney
Viv Thomas (born 1948), South African-born British pornographic producer
Vivien Thomas (1910–1985), American surgical technician and medical researcher

W
Walter Thomas (disambiguation)
Ward Thomas (television executive) (1923–2019), British television executive
Warren Thomas (1958–2005), American comedian
W. Aubrey Thomas (1866–1951), U.S. Representative from Ohio
Wayne Thomas (disambiguation), multiple people
W. C. E. Thomas (William C. E. Thomas, 1818–1876), American civic leader
Wendy Thomas (born 1961), American businesswoman and former mascot of Wendy's
Wendy Thomas (politician) (born 1958 or 1959), New Hampshire state representative
Werner Thomas (born 1931), Swiss accordionist
Wes Thomas (born 1987), English footballer
W. Ian Thomas (1914–2007), Christian speaker and author
Wilfred Thomas (1875–1953), inaugural Bishop of Brandon
Wilfrid Thomas (1904–1991) British-Australian singer and broadcaster
Wilhelm Thomas (1892–1976), German Generalleutnant during World War II
Will, William and Willie Thomas (disambiguation), multiple people
Willis Thomas (born 1937), American basketball player
W. I. Thomas (1863–1947), American sociologist

X
Xavier Thomas (born 1999), American football player

Y
Yann Thomas (born 1990), English rugby union footballer

Z
Zach Thomas (disambiguation), multiple people
Zephaniah Thomas (born 1989), English-born footballer who plays for St. Kitts and Nevis

Fictional characters
Arthur Thomas (Emmerdale), fictional character from the British soap opera Emmerdale
Ashley Thomas (Emmerdale), fictional character from the British soap opera Emmerdale
Bernice Thomas (Emmerdale), fictional character from the British soap opera Emmerdale
Jasmine Thomas, fictional character from the British soap opera Emmerdale

See also
Brendon Thomas and The Vibes, New Zealand rock band
Edward Thomas (locomotive), a steam locomotive on the Talyllyn Railway, Wales
Evan Thomas, Radcliffe and Company, Wales-based shipping company
The Jackie Thomas Show, an American sitcom that aired on ABC from 1992 to 1993
Odd Thomas (character), featured in several novels by Dean Koontz
Odd Thomas (novel), the first of such novels
Odd Thomas (film), a 2013 film based on the Dean Koontz novel of the same name
Owen Thomas (automobile company), founded in 1908 in Janesville, Wisconsin
Pat Thomas Stadium, baseball stadium in Leesburg, Florida
Thomas, Thomas, German short mockumentary film
T. Thomas & Son, American architectural firm
Ward Thomas (band) British country music band
Ward Thomas Removals British removal firm
Thomason (disambiguation)
General Thomas (disambiguation)

References

Welsh-language surnames
Surnames of French origin
Surnames of Welsh origin
English-language surnames
Anglo-Cornish surnames
German-language surnames
French-language surnames
Patronymic surnames
Surnames from given names